Saint-Vincent-de-Paul is a commune in the Landes department in Nouvelle-Aquitaine in southwestern France.

The village was formerly called Pouy. It was renamed in 1828 after Saint Vincent de Paul, who was born there. Tourists can visit his parents' home and learn about his work in the "Berceau", only a few miles (several km) from Dax.

Population

See also
Communes of the Landes department

References

Communes of Landes (department)